Utricularia polygaloides is a small, probably annual carnivorous plant that belongs to the genus Utricularia. It is native to India and Sri Lanka. It was originally described by Michael Pakenham Edgeworth in 1847.

See also 
 List of Utricularia species

References 

Carnivorous plants of Asia
Flora of India (region)
Flora of Sri Lanka
polygaloides